Nora is a Venezuelan telenovela written by Ibsen Martínez for Televen in co-production with  Telemundo and Cadena Tres. Carla Giraldo and Andrés Zúñiga star as the main protagonists with Sabrina Seara as the antagonist.

Synopsis 
The determination of Latin American women to overcome adversity is the driving force behind NORA, a beautiful and simple young woman of popular extraction, but determined to excel.
The eldest of four siblings - all sons of different men - she is concerned that they will get better and take care of her mother Belen, who has fallen into depression and addictions due to the bitter setbacks to her fortune.
Nora Acevedo performs the terrible ritual of visiting Mayimbe, her brother who is a prisoner.        
Fate wants a scandalous prison riot during that visit, something that will change her life.
Nora is kidnapped by Mingo Vidal, the inmates' leader, to use her as a bargaining chip in the conflict with Daniel Moros, an important prison commissioner and the girl's boyfriend.
In the conflict, Nora meets Félix Villamil -like Villasmil, but without the inserted "S"-, a mysterious prisoner with brilliant computer skills and a magician in disguise, who has been chosen by a dark power to be released in exchange for doing an undisclosed job.
Villamil falls in love with the young woman and, contrary to the designs of all the dark threads moving around the riot, takes her with him on his escape, to protect her and save her life.
Nora is surprised by the charming stranger. Though it's hard to admit, the episode has changed her. The prestigious and impeccable Daniel Moros detects him and begins to develop dangerous obsessive nuances in his love for the girl. The relationship is no longer the same.
In the same city, but in a very different social stratum, the captain of the company Otoniel Lobo and his daughter Melisa operate. For Otoniel it is a painful frustration to see that the heiress to his fortune does not wear the shoes of his leadership.        He judges her frivolous and spoiled; while Melisa bitterly suffers from her father's lack of love, not finding a place for her.
As he approaches old age, Otoniel feels the urge to find a daughter he once denied and who is none other than Nora. Will she be the Bloodwolf's heir to lead ambitious projects?
Nora cannot decide between pursuing her life's goals or succumbing to the charms of the kindly Robin Hood bully played by Felix Villamil. Daniel has been a good man and doesn't deserve to be betrayed. Or is it that Commissioner Moros is not what everyone thinks?
But all these characters and many more will find themselves - and collide - under the roof of O'Lobo Enterprises, where two sisters who don't know each other will fall in love with the same man, someone who runs from both sides of the law, determined to wash his name away to deserve NORA.
A story of overwhelming powers, threatening to mercilessly trample on an explosive feeling, which cannot be hidden.

Cast

References

External links 

Televen telenovelas
Venezuelan telenovelas
Mexican telenovelas
2014 telenovelas
2014 Venezuelan television series debuts
2014 Venezuelan television series endings
Spanish-language telenovelas